Round Lake Park is a village in Lake County, Illinois, United States. Per the 2020 census, the population was 7,680. It is located along the south side of the lake, Round Lake. Access to the lake from this town is private and only for residents of Round Lake Park.

Geography
Round Lake Park is located at  (42.343688, -88.079175).

Major streets
 
  Belvidere Road
  Main Street
 Washington Street
 Hainesville Road
 Peterson Road
 Alleghany Road

Demographics

2020 census

Note: the US Census treats Hispanic/Latino as an ethnic category. This table excludes Latinos from the racial categories and assigns them to a separate category. Hispanics/Latinos can be of any race.

2000 Census
As of the census of 2000, there were 6,038 people, 2,131 households, and 1,562 families residing in the village. The racial makeup of the village was 81.24% White, 1.72% African American, 0.36% Native American, 0.55% Asian, 0.02% Pacific Islander, 13.53% from other races, and 2.58% from two or more races. Hispanic or Latino of any race were 26.23% of the population.

There were 2,131 households, out of which 32.8% had children under the age of 18 living with them, 57.4% were married couples living together, 10.6% had a female householder with no husband present, and 26.7% were non-families. 22.1% of all households were made up of individuals, and 12.1% had someone living alone who was 65 years of age or older. The average household size was 2.83 and the average family size was 3.29.

In the village, the population was spread out, with 27.8% under the age of 18, 9.0% from 18 to 24, 29.2% from 25 to 44, 16.9% from 45 to 64, and 17.0% who were 65 years of age or older. The median age was 34 years. For every 100 females, there were 100.5 males. For every 100 females age 18 and over, there were 95.2 males.

The median income for a household in the village was $44,896, and the median income for a family was $48,369. Males had a median income of $39,299 versus $25,743 for females. The per capita income for the village was $18,279. About 8.0% of families and 10.0% of the population were below the poverty line, including 17.6% of those under age 18 and 0.9% of those age 65 or over.

References

External links
Village of Round Lake Park official website

Villages in Illinois
Villages in Lake County, Illinois
Majority-minority cities and towns in Lake County, Illinois